Suria KLCC is a 6-story shopping mall located at the foot of the Petronas Twin Towers. Suria KLCC is a premier shopping destination with over 300 flagship stores. The shopping mall is situated in Kuala Lumpur City Centre, Kuala Lumpur, Malaysia.

History and design
"Suria" is a native Malay word derived from Sanskrit "surya", meaning "sunshine". Opened in May 1998, the shopping mall was conceived as part of the Kuala Lumpur City Centre (KLCC) project, constructed at the foot of the Petronas Twin Towers. The mall offers views of KLCC Park and Lake Symphony. The mall's floor plan is crescent-shaped, featuring its three ground-level exits wings to Jalan Ampang, Jalan P. Ramlee, and Persiaran Petronas where direct access to the lobby of the towers, the Petronas Philharmonic Hall and Lake Symphony are available. On the concourse level, the Light Rail Transit (LRT) entrance is available at the Ampang end, and the entrance to the Kuala Lumpur Convention Centre is via a tunnel off the centre court.

Management

Suria KLCC is the largest retail property under the management of Suria KLCC Sdn. Bhd. Other properties under their management include Alamanda Putrajaya, a regional shopping centre, and Mesra Mall Terengganu, a sub-regional shopping centre.

Transportation
The mall's Jalan Ampang entrance is a major rapidKL and GoKL bus hub. Examples of routes serving it are 402 (Maluri - Titiwangsa) and 300 (Pandan Mewah - Ampang - Lebuh Ampang/Jalan Munshi Abdullah).

Suria KLCC is connected to the KJ10 underground KLCC LRT station, located at the Ampang end of the mall on the concourse level via an underground pedestrian walkway. In 2022 another underground station on the MRT Putrajaya Line, provisionally named Persiaran KLCC will open.

There are 5400 parking bays in its basement parking lot.

Features
Suria KLCC has 140,000 m² (1,500,000 sq ft) of space. It has six levels and features mostly foreign luxury goods and high-street labels. The mall includes an art gallery, an underwater aquarium and also a Science Discovery centre. A 12 screen cinema, and a concert hall also reside in the mall.

Within KLCC Park, sited at the esplanade outside of Suria KLCC, lies the 10,000 sq ft man-made Lake Symphony. In the lake, two musical fountains are situated within.

See also

References

External links 

 Kuala Lumpur Convention Centre

Shopping malls in Kuala Lumpur
1998 establishments in Malaysia
Shopping malls established in 1998